Apache Camel is an open source framework for message-oriented middleware with a rule-based routing and mediation engine that provides a Java object-based implementation of the Enterprise Integration Patterns using an application programming interface (or declarative Java domain-specific language) to configure routing and mediation rules.

The domain-specific language means that Apache Camel can support type-safe smart completion of routing rules in an integrated development environment using regular Java code without large amounts of XML configuration files, though XML configuration inside Spring Framework is also supported.

Camel is often used with Apache ServiceMix, Apache ActiveMQ and Apache CXF in service-oriented architecture projects.

Tooling
 Several Apache Maven-plugins are provided for validation and deployment.
 Graphical, Eclipse-based tooling is freely available from Red Hat. It provides graphical editing and debugging and advanced validation.
 Eclipse based tooling from Talend.

See also
 AdroitLogic UltraESB
 Apache ServiceMix
 Red Hat Fuse
 Guaraná DSL
 Mule (software) 
 Open ESB
 Service Component Architecture (SCA)
 Petals ESB
 IBM Integration Bus
 Akka (toolkit)  open-source toolkit and runtime for Reactive programming, concurrent and distributed applications on the JVM with camel integration.

Books

References

External links
 Apache Camel Home

Camel
Enterprise application integration
Java enterprise platform
Message-oriented middleware
Service-oriented architecture-related products
Web scraping